PriMedia Inc is a media buying and marketing firm based in Rhode Island, U.S. The company was founded by Edward Valenti and Barry Becher,  and helped pioneer infomercials, the use of credit cards and 800 numbers on Television ads, and the 30-minute infomercial format on shopping channels .

James J. Cooney, who was a teenager when he first met the firm's co-founders, later joined the firm.

History

PriMedia was founded in 1975 (then named Dial Media) by Edward Valenti and Barry Becher.  PriMedia became the first major infomercial company and launched several mainstream products including the Ginsu knives. The company also developed the “long-form” infomercial formats, which later developed into standard half-hour infomercial formats used in Home shopping channels including QVC and HSN. Primedia was one of the first to use toll-free telephone numbers in television ads to allow use of credit cards to order products in real-time. The company is a media buying and marketing firm based in Warwick, Rhode Island.

References

1975 establishments in Rhode Island
Marketing companies of the United States